Agave ghiesbreghtii  is an evergreen plant belonging to the family Asparagaceae, subfamily Agavoideae. The plant grows in clustering rosettes, up to 75 cm in diameter and 50 cm tall with wide leaves which are guttered on top. In spring the plant produces dense greenish brown to purple flowers on the top half of the unbranched spike which measures between 2.5m - 5m tall. The species is endemic in Guatemala and the State of Mexico in Mexico.

References

ghiesbreghtii
Flora of Guatemala
Flora of the State of Mexico